Vietor may refer to:

People
Conradus Viëtor, 17th-century Dutch Lutheran minister
Deborah Vietor-Engländer, British author
Harold Duane Vietor (born 1931), American judge
Hieronymus Vietor (ca. 1480 – late 1546 or early 1547), printer active in Kraków and Vienna
Tommy Vietor (born 1980), American public official and podcaster
Wilhelm Viëtor (1850–1918), German phonetician

Other uses
Vietor Rock, rock formation in Antarctica

Occupational surnames
Latin-language surnames